Cootehill Celtic is a Gaelic games club from County Cavan in Ireland.  It is affiliated to Cavan GAA. It fields teams at every age group in both Gaelic football and hurling and is the only dual club in county Cavan. The Club has recently registered with the LGFA and now has Girls from U-8 to U-14 teams.
Ref; Cavan GAA County Board

History
The club was founded in 1894 by a number of emigrants who returned from Scotland to their home town of Cootehill upon their retirement. They named the club Cootehill Celtic after Glasgow Celtic FC which had been formed by a Marist priest from County Mayo called Brother Walfrid in 1888. Both clubs wear the same colours and fly the tricolour at home games.

Kit
Traditionally Cootehill Celtic have always worn green and white hooped jerseys.

Honours
 Cavan Senior Football Championship 3
 1953, 1954, 1955
 Cavan Senior Hurling Championship 6
 1932, 1965, 2014, 2015, 2016, 2021
 Cavan Intermediate Football Championship 2
 1971, 2014
 Cavan Junior Football Championship 3
 1952, 1960, 1969
 Cavan Minor Football Championship 1
 1959

References

External links
Official Cavan GAA Website
Cavan Club GAA

Gaelic games clubs in County Cavan
Gaelic football clubs in County Cavan